Round-tower churches are a type of church found mainly in England, mostly in East Anglia; of about 185 surviving examples in the country, 124 are in Norfolk, 38 in Suffolk, six in Essex, three in Sussex and two each in Cambridgeshire and Berkshire.  There is evidence of about 20 round-tower churches in Germany, of similar design and construction to those in East Anglia. Countries with at least one round-tower church include Andorra, the Czech Republic, Denmark, France, Italy, Sweden, Norway, Poland and South Africa.

There is no consensus between experts for why the distribution of round-tower churches in England is concentrated in the East of England:

Round-tower churches are found in areas lacking normal building stone, and are therefore built of knapped flint.  Corners are difficult to construct in flint, hence the thick, round walls of the towers.
The churches are found in areas subject to raids from, for example, the Vikings, and were built as defensive structures, churches being added later.  In fact, however, the towers are generally too short to have been of much use defensively, and the towers were often added to existing churches, having flat walls where they joined the main structure.
In 937 King Athelstan (924–939), the first King of all England, decrees that a bell tower be built on the land of every thane; an existing trend of building bell towers on to existing churches was thus accelerated.

Many other (less likely) explanations are offered in communities containing the churches, including appeals to ancient stone circles and the remains of wells.

Round-tower churches should not be confused with similarly shaped structures such as the Irish round towers found in Ireland and Scotland, or with round churches, which have a circular plan and are often found in Denmark or Sweden.

List of round tower churches in England

Berkshire
Great Shefford, St Mary
Welford, St Gregory

Cambridgeshire
Bartlow, St Mary
Snailwell, St Peter

Essex

Norfolk

Suffolk

Sussex
Lewes, St Michael
Piddinghoe, St John
Southease, St Peter

List of round tower churches in Sweden

Scania

Blentarp
Bollerup
Dagstorp (demolished in 19th century)
Hammarlöv
Hammarlunda
Önnarp (demolished in 19th century)

Sources
Round Tower Churches Society
Focus on Round Tower – by John Worrall
W. J. Goode, Round Tower Churches of South East England (Round Tower Churches Society)
Lyn Stilgoe and Dorothy Shreeve, The Round Tower Churches of Norfolk, Canterbury Press, Norwich;

External links
The Roundtowerchurches in Europe
Interactive map and gazetteer of the round tower churches in England by The Temple Trail

Church architecture
Anglo-Saxon architecture
 
!